This is the list of films produced in Yugoslavia in the 1950s. For an alphabetical list of Yugoslav films see :Category:Yugoslav films.

1950s

See also
List of Serbian films
List of Croatian films
List of Bosnia-Herzegovina films
List of Macedonian films
List of Slovenian films
List of Montenegrin films

External links
 Yugoslav film at the Internet Movie Database

1950s
Films
Yugoslavia